A Fazenda 4 was the fourth season of the Brazilian reality television series A Fazenda which premiered Tuesday, July 19, 2011 at 11:15 p.m. on RecordTV.

This season was confirmed on late December 2010, before the finale of the third season. Britto Junior and Chris Couto reprise their hosting stints for the show. Tina Roma makes her debut as the show's new special correspondent.

For the first time ever, four women reached the finals, making this the first reality show in Brazilian television history with public voting to do so. No Limite 1 (2000) and Aprendiz 6 − Universitário (2009) also managed to create all female final fours but there was no public vote involved.

On October 12, 2011, personal trainer Joana Machado won the competition with 48% of the public vote over TV host Monique Evans (44%) and DJ Raquel Pacheco (8%).

Production

Overview
Due to the 2011 Pan American Games, the fourth season marked the return of the show to its original run, during the South American winter–spring, following the spring airing of the past two seasons. The fourth season lasted a total of 87 days, an increase of one day over the past season.

Cast
There are fourteen celebrities new to Farm. As part of the twist for this edition, three former contestants re-entered the Farm for another chance to win the grand prize, which remains R$2,000,000 without tax allowances. Duda Yankovich was ejected on day 23 and was replaced two days later by Dani Bolina, who entered on day 25.

Broadcasts
The main television coverage of A Fazenda 4 is screened in daily highlight programs that transmit Mondays to Fridays at 11:15pm (UTC−3), Saturdays at 10:15pm (UTC−3) and Sundays at 08:00pm (first four weeks) and at 11:15pm (for the remainder of the season) (UTC−3), with Sundays, Tuesdays and Thursdays shows being broadcast live on Rede Record.

The episodes summarize the events of the previous day in the Farm. It is the first season to be filmed and broadcast in high-definition.

Contestants
Biographical information according to Record official series site, plus footnoted additions.
(ages stated are at time of contest)

Future Appearances
In 2016, Valesca Popozuda appeared in Dança dos Famosos 13, she finished in 10th place in the competition.

In 2017, Dinei returned to compete in A Fazenda 9, he finished in 13th place in the competition.

In 2018, Marlon appeared with his wife Leticia Oliveira in Power Couple Brasil 3, they finished in 5th place in the competition.

In 2021, Dinei and Valesca Popozuda appeared in Ilha Record 1. Dinei originally finished in 13th place, however he comeback to the game and finished in 5th place, while Valesca finished in 4th place.

In 2022, Dinei appeared with his wife Erika Dias in Power Couple Brasil 6, they finished in 12th place in the competition.

The game
The fourth season featured the return of actress Franciely Freduzeski (season 1), assistant referee Ana Paula Oliveira (season 2) and TV host Monique Evans (season 3), who were the first celebrities to be evicted in their respective seasons, for another chance to win the grand prize.

Contestants were divided into three teams of five members. On week 8, the teams competed in the season's super challenge for a chance to win an R$500,000 extra prize (equally divided between the remaining team members).

Team Ostrich (Dinei, Gui, Thiago and Valesca) won the challenge, with each one of them winning R$125,000.

Voting history

Notes

Ratings and reception

Brazilian ratings
All numbers are in points and provided by Kantar Ibope Media.

 Each point represents 58.000 households in São Paulo.

Controversies

Duda Yankovich
On August 9, 2011, boxer champion Duda Yankovich was ejected due to violent behaviour towards actor Thiago Gagliasso after an argument between them during a basketball game in the pool. Model Dani Bolina entered the game on August 11, 2011 as Duda's replacement.

The fact that gained much media attention since the incident and even more after the ejection. The network's decision was highly praised by the press and viewers.

Thiago Gagliasso
On September 7, 2011, actor Thiago Gagliasso made a controversial comment regarding that he has slapped some goats behind the chicken coop, a place that, according to him, there would be no cameras. A YouTube user posted the clip of the comment online. Several NGOs such as PEA, manifested on Twitter asking for Thiago's ejection.

Record, broadcaster of the program, released a public statement on September 8 regarding the controversial statement stating that the farm is monitored 24 hours a day and in no time, Thiago or any other contestant was caught assaulting a goat or any other animal. The chicken coop area where the goats cross during the morning activity, is filmed and images of Thiago on that area have already been aired. All the farm animals are healthy, well cared and daily monitoring.

TV host Luísa Mell, known for her work to protect animals, began a campaign to evict the actor. Singer Rita Lee was also outraged and used Twitter to express herself. "Bruno Gagliasso sorry, but your brother is a jerk. Get Thiago out!", she wrote. Despite Record statement, the controversy only increased.

As result of Thiago Gagliasso's behaviour, on September 10, all contestants had to sleep outside the farmhouse as a punishment. Farmer of the week Raquel Pacheco read a warning statement from the production: "All animals deserve respect and care". The actor apologized to the house, but was outraged at the punishment. Valesca asked him to control himself when he began to curse the animals.

References

External links
 Official Site 

2011 Brazilian television seasons
A Fazenda